The 2001 Trans-Am Series was the 36th season of the Sports Car Club of America's Trans-Am Series. The victory at Portland would mark Dodge's final Trans Am win until the 2012 Trans-Am Series.

Results

Source:

Championships
Source:

Drivers
Paul Gentilozzi - 287 points
Brian Simo - 255 points
Johnny Miller - 255 points
Tommy Archer - 221 points
Justin Bell - 219 points
Lou Gigliotti - 214 points
Michael Lewis - 197 points
Boris Said - 166 points
Bob Ruman - 142 points
Leighton Reese - 140 points

Owners
Rocketsports#64 - 142 
Rocketsports#3 - 140 
Cinjo Racing#36 - 138 
Ruhlman Motorsports#49 - 134 
TDM Motorsports#15 - 132 
Fix Motorsports#77 - 127 
LAC Motorsports#35 - 123 
Derhaag Motorsports#40 - 122 
Autocon Motorsports#12 - 116 
TDM Motorsports#05 - 115

Manufacturers
Jaguar – 139 points
Chevrolet – 117 points
Qvale Automobiles – 80 points
Dodge – 80 points
Panoz – 44 points
Ford – 36 points

References

Trans-Am Series
2001 in American motorsport